Masumabad (also Romanized as Ma‘şūmābād; also known as Ma‘şūmābād-e Qeshlāq) is a village in Cheshmeh Saran Rural District, Cheshmeh Saran District, Azadshahr County, Golestan Province, Iran. At the 2006 census, its population was 86, in 26 families.

References 

Populated places in Azadshahr County